The 1973 1. divisjon was the 29th completed season of top division football in Norway.

Overview
It was contested by 12 teams, and Viking FK won the championship, their second consecutive league title and their third top-flight title overall.

Fredrikstad, who was the only remaining team to have played all 28 completed seasons in the top division, was relegated in the end of the season.

Teams and locations
''Note: Table lists in alphabetical order.

League table

Results

Season statistics

Top scorer
 Stein Karlsen, HamKam – 17 goals

Attendances

References
Norway - List of final tables (RSSSF)
Norsk internasjonal fotballstatistikk (NIFS)

Eliteserien seasons
Norway
1